Oksana Okunyeva (also transliterated Okuneva or Okunieva, born 14 March 1990 in Mykolaiv) is a Ukrainian high jumper.

She won the silver medal at the European U23 Championships in Ostrava, Czech Republic, and finished first at the World Challenge Hengelo in the Netherlands.

Her personal best jump is 1.98 metres, achieved in Berdychiv on 28 June 2014 at the Memorial of Vitaliy Lonsky.

International competitions

References

External links
 
 

1990 births
Living people
Sportspeople from Mykolaiv
Ukrainian female high jumpers
World Athletics Championships athletes for Ukraine
Athletes (track and field) at the 2016 Summer Olympics
Olympic athletes of Ukraine
Universiade medalists in athletics (track and field)
Universiade gold medalists for Ukraine
Competitors at the 2011 Summer Universiade
Medalists at the 2017 Summer Universiade
21st-century Ukrainian women